Podmoky is name of several locations in the Czech Republic: 
Podmoky (Havlíčkův Brod District) 
Podmoky (Nymburk District)